Madannapet mandi is a vegetable market located at Madannapet in Hyderabad, India. Vegetables are brought to the market by farmers from Ranga Reddy district. It is owned by a local committee.

History
Madannapet mandi was started in the 1980s.

References

Retail markets in Hyderabad, India
Retail markets in India